Lucerne is a city in Switzerland.

Lucerne, Luzern, or Luzerne may also refer to:

Places
Canton of Lucerne, a Canton in Switzerland, where the city is located
Lake Lucerne, a lake in Switzerland
La Lucerne-d'Outremer, a village and commune in France
Lucerna, a neighborhood in Santo Domingo, Dominican Republic

United States 
Lucerne, Arkansas; see List of places in Arkansas: L
Lucerne, Lake County, California, a census-designated place
Lucerne Valley, California, a census-designated place
Lucerne, Colorado, an unincorporated community
Lucerne, Indiana, an unincorporated community
Lucerne, Kansas, a former town and post office
Luzerne, Kentucky, an unincorporated community
Lucerne, Michigan, a former settlement
Luzerne, Michigan, and unincorporated community
Lucerne, Missouri, a village
Lucerne, Columbiana County, Ohio, a ghost town
Lucerne, Knox County, Ohio, an unincorporated community
Lucerne, Pennsylvania; see List of places in Pennsylvania: Lo–Ly
Lucerne (Brownsville, Tennessee), a historic house and former plantation
Lucerne, Washington, an unincorporated community
Lucerne, West Virginia, an unincorporated community
Lucerne, Wyoming, a census-designated place
Lucerne Mines, Pennsylvania, a census-designated place
Luzerne, Iowa, a city
Luzerne County, Pennsylvania, a county
Luzerne, Pennsylvania, a borough in Luzerne County
Luzerne Township, Fayette County, Pennsylvania, a township

People 
 Anne-César, Chevalier de la Luzerne (1741–1791), French soldier and ambassador
 Antoine Garaby de La Luzerne (1617–1679), French author and moralist

Other uses
Lucerne (shipwreck), shipwreck site off the coast of La Pointe, Wisconsin
 Buick Lucerne, a full-size luxury sedan introduced for the 2006 model year
 Lucerne hammer, a medieval polearm weapon
 Lucerne, the store brand for dairy and other products by Safeway Inc. or its subsidiaries.  The rights to the Lucerne brand in Canada belong to Agropur and is sold in Canadian Safeway and Sobeys stores.
Alfalfa, Medicago sativa, a species of perennial flowering plant also known as lucerne
 Cytisus proliferus, tree lucerne, a small evergreen tree

See also
Lake Lucerne (disambiguation)